Hussein Al-Taib Maki (born 1 July 1941) is a Saudi Arabian athlete. He competed in the men's shot put at the 1972 Summer Olympics.

References

1941 births
Living people
Athletes (track and field) at the 1972 Summer Olympics
Saudi Arabian male shot putters
Olympic athletes of Saudi Arabia
Place of birth missing (living people)